Professor Murray Forsyth, (b. 1936 Victoria, Hong Kong), is a British political scientist.

Biography
He was educated at Wellington College. and Balliol College, Oxford. He is Emeritus Professor of  Politics at the University of Leicester.

Books

 Unions of states : the theory and practice of confederation, 1981
  Reason and Revolution: The Political Thought of the Abbe Sieyes, 1987
 The Political Classics: A Guide to the Essential Texts from Plato to Rousseau, 1992
 The Political Classics: Hamilton to Mill, 1993
 The Political Classics: Green to Dworkin , 1996

References

British political scientists
Living people
Year of birth missing (living people)